Dominique Zardi (born Emile Jean Cohen-Zardi; 2 March 1930 – 13 December 2009) was a French actor from Paris. He acted in more than 200 feature films, including Fantômas with Louis De Funès and Jean Marais. He died of cancer at the age of 79. He was the uncle of the actress and film director Agnès Jaoui.

Filmography

References

External links 
 
 Fragments d'un dictionnaire amoureux
 Official site

1930 births
2009 deaths
Male actors from Paris
French male film actors
Burials at Père Lachaise Cemetery
20th-century French male actors
French Sephardi Jews